Before 1502 the East African city of Mombasa was part of the Kilwa Sultanate. The independent Mombasa sultanate named Mvita (Swahili) or Manbasa (Arabic) was then established, but was conquered by the Portuguese Empire during the 16th century. After this control alternated between the Portuguese and the Sultanate of Oman, before the establishment of the British East Africa Protectorate in 1887. Mombasa became part of independent Kenya in 1963.

See also 
Kenya
Heads of State of Kenya
Heads of Government of Kenya
Colonial Heads of Kenya
Lists of incumbents

Mombasa, Rulers
Mombasa
Mombasa
Mombasa